John B. "Jack" Sidoli (15 September 1855 – 3 November 1934) was an Australian rules footballer for  in the 19th century, noted for his versatility. He also played cricket for South Australia, and was a member of the Royal South Australian Yacht Squadron. He was both a football and cricket umpire.

Football 
John Sidoli was a foundation player for the Port Adelaide Football Club. 

He won two Port Adelaide best and fairest awards, in 1880 and 1881, and would also play in the club's inaugural premiership in 1884. Sidoli also played eight interstate football matches for South Australia, while his career total of 148 games was a club record until broken by Harry "Tick" Phillips in 1897.

Jack Reedman described John Sidoli in 1923 as "One of the best. He was a big little man. He also followed for Port and could keep up the pace all day. Jack was a splendid kick, but was not looked to as one likely materially to add to the goal tally...Jack was decidedly clever at little marks – none could show him points in that connection."

In 1934 the Adelaide publication Sport described Sidoli as a footballer who could "follow all through a match...Always one of the best, both temperamentally and in the ruck. He could take a knock and return the compliment with a smile, instead of trying to annihilate the cove who gave him the cropper."

Cricket 
John Sidoli played for the South Australian cricket team in six interstate matches.

Tradesman 
Sidoli worked as a shipwright and blacksmith in Port Adelaide, initially working in a partnership as Hosie & Sidoli before founding his own business, Sidoli and Son; which he retired from in about 1931.

Personal life 
He had one brother, Angelo Gabriel, and two sisters, A. Ringer and L. A. Quinn. Sidoli and his wife, Mary Ann, had 11 children.  He was survived by three sons, Herbert, Jack and Arnold, and five daughters, Marion, Victoria, Madeline, Lorna and A. B. Mortimer.

John Sidoli was an uncle to John Quinn Sr. and thus a great uncle to Bob Quinn and Tom Quinn.

References

External links

1850s births
1934 deaths
Australian rules footballers from South Australia
Cricketers from South Australia
Australian cricket umpires
Port Adelaide Football Club (SANFL) players
Port Adelaide Football Club players (all competitions)
Australian people of Italian descent